Tom English (born 8 March 1993) is an Australian rugby player, currently playing with the Melbourne Rebels in the Super Rugby. English plays as a centre, however, he can play on the wing.

Rugby career

Rugby sevens
English is a former Australia Sevens representative.
In 2011, he was named at inside centre for Sydney University in the final of the Shute Shield. The side was to be captained by Rebels flanker Tim Davidson.

Rebels
In late 2012 English joined the Melbourne Rebels Extended Playing Squad. He stayed with the Rebels into 2013 and was named on the bench to play the Western Force in Round 1 and ACT Brumbies for Round 2 but didn't play. He made his Super Rugby debut when he replaced inside center Rory Sidey against the Reds in Round 4. Seven weeks later he started on the right wing and played 58 minutes before being replaced by Lachlan Mitchell.

In 2014, English faced competition for a place in the Rebels centers from Mitch Inman and New Zealand import Tamati Ellison.

In May 2014 English was invited to train with the Wallaby squad preparing for series against France.

Super Rugby statistics

References

External links
 Melbourne Rebels Profile

Living people
1991 births
Australian rugby union players
Rugby union players from Sydney
Rugby union centres
Melbourne Rebels players
Melbourne Rising players
Male rugby sevens players
Australian expatriate rugby union players
Expatriate rugby union players in Japan
Kurita Water Gush Akishima players
Rugby union wings